Ang Huling Henya is a 2013 Filipino action-horror comedy film directed by Marlon Rivera starring Rufa Mae Quinto. The film, produced by Viva Films and Multivision Pictures and distributed by Viva Films officially premiered in the Philippines on August 21, 2013.

Cast
Rufa Mae Quinto as Miri Alvarez
Edgar Allan Guzman as Mark Alvarez
Candy Pangilinan as Peachy Powers
Ayen Munji-Laurel as Miriam Alvarez
DJ Durano as Andrew Alvarez
Ricci Chan as Joan / Jonas
Robert Seña as Uncle Greg
Valerie Weigmann as Victoria
Fabio Ide as Yllana
Kalila Aguilos as Gigi
Kean Cipriano as Dexter
Jovic Monsod as Jojo
Tess Antonio as Elevator Operator
Frances Ignacio as Tita Elaine
Julienn Mendoza as Prof Tirona 
Stella Cañete as Mrs. Tirona	
M. Barretto as	Assassin 
Harvey Cruz as	Assassin
Tinz Diaz as Assassin 
Marcelo Baldomar as Assassin
Marvin Agustin as Lee (uncredited)
Abby Bautista as Young Miri (uncredited)
Cherie Gil as Chief Gabriel 
Marco Antonio Masa as Young Mark (uncredited)
Joaqui Valdes as Flirting Guy at the Grocery (uncredited)
Gwen Zamora as French girl

External links
 

2013 films
Philippine action horror films
Philippine comedy horror films
Philippine science fiction action films
2010s Tagalog-language films
Filipino-language films
2013 romantic comedy films
2013 comedy horror films
Filipino zombie films
2010s English-language films
Films directed by Marlon N. Rivera